Bagua Grande may refer to:

Bagua Grande, a town in Peru
Bagua Grande District, a district in the Utcubamba province, Peru